Cornelis van der Gijp (1 August 1931 – 12 November 2022) was a Dutch footballer who played as a forward.  Van der Gijp made his professional debut at SC Emma and also played for Feyenoord and Blauw Wit.

Club career
Van der Gijp made his debut for hometown side Emma in 1950, playing alongside his brothers Wim, Freek and Janus. He moved to Feyenoord in 1955, making his debut in 1956 to become the club's all-time top goalscorer with 177 goals in 233 league games. He played in a famous forward line alongside Henk Schouten and Coen Moulijn and won two league titles with the club.

International career
Van der Gijp made his debut for the Netherlands in a March 1954 friendly match against England and earned a total of 13 caps, scoring 6 goals. His final international was an October 1961 World Cup qualification match away against Hungary.

Managerial career
Van der Gijp later coached  Veendam.

Personal life and death
A very fast center forward, Cor was an uncle of Dutch international winger René van der Gijp and spent his final years in a Dordrecht nursing home.

Van der Gijp died on 12 November 2022, at the age of 91.

Honours
Feyenoord
 Eredivisie: 1960–61, 1961–62

References

External links
 

 Profile

1931 births
2022 deaths
Dutch footballers
Footballers from Dordrecht
Association football forwards
Netherlands international footballers
Footballers at the 1952 Summer Olympics
Olympic footballers of the Netherlands
SC Emma players
Feyenoord players
Blauw-Wit Amsterdam players
Eredivisie players
Dutch football managers
SC Veendam managers
BVV Barendrecht managers
RVVH managers
20th-century Dutch people